Norway competed at the 1992 Summer Paralympics in Barcelona, Spain. 38 competitors from Norway won 33 medals, including 13 gold, 13 silver and 7 bronze and finished 10th in the medal table.

See also 
 Norway at the Paralympics
 Norway at the 1992 Summer Olympics

References 

Nations at the 1992 Summer Paralympics
1992
Summer Paralympics